Ingrid Appelquist (born 21 February 1931) is a Swedish female curler.

Teams

References

External links
 
Svensk Curling nr 1 2013 by Svenska Curlingförbundet – issuu (page 12–13, "Inga Arfwidsson")

Living people
1931 births
Swedish female curlers
European curling champions
Swedish curling champions
20th-century Swedish women